Holbeche House (also, in some texts, Holbeach or Holbeache) is a mansion located approximately  north of Kingswinford, now in the Metropolitan Borough of Dudley but historically in Staffordshire.  Some members of the Gunpowder Plot were either killed or captured at Holbeche House in 1605.

Gunpowder Plot

The Gunpowder Plot was an attempt by a small party of provincial English Catholics to blow up the House of Lords during the State Opening of Parliament, thereby killing James I and his court, as the prelude to a revolt during which a Catholic monarchy would be restored to the English throne.

It was after the failure of the plot that the fugitives took shelter in Holbeche House, owned by Stephen Lyttelton.  They had taken supplies from Warwick Castle on 6 November and weapons and gunpowder from Hewell Grange on 7 November, but the powder became damp in the rain.  After arriving at Holbeche House at about 10 pm, several were maimed when gunpowder left to dry in front of the fire was ignited by a stray spark.  At about noon the next day, 8 November 1605, the house was surrounded by a posse led by Richard Walsh (the Sheriff of Worcestershire), originally seeking those responsible for the raid at Warwick Castle.  Most of the plotters were either killed or wounded in the ensuing fight.  Some walls have holes from muskets used in the storming of the house in 1605.  Those still alive were taken to London and later tried and executed.

House
The building was constructed in around 1600.  The original house has a central block of three bays, with two stories and an attic with dormer windows, and projecting side wings with Dutch gables at each end.  Some original wood panelling remains inside.  New façades were added in the early 19th century, and the house was later expanded.

In 1951, it became a Grade II* listed building, as Holbeache House. It is now a private nursing home operated by Four Seasons Health Care.

Notes

References

Lucy Aikin, Memoirs of the Court of King James the First . 1822
Katherine Thomson, Recollections of Literary Characters and Celebrated Places. 1854
John Bond, The Hazards of Life and All That: A Look at Some Accidents and Safety Curiosities, Past and Present . CRC Press, 1996. 

 Gunpowder Plot Society
 Holbeche House Care Home, Four Seasons Health Care
 Holbeache House, British Listed Buildings

Gunpowder Plot
Country houses in Staffordshire
Grade II listed buildings in Staffordshire
1600 establishments in England